The Board of Control for Cricket in India (BCCI) has found itself in the middle of many conflicts with various cricket boards around the world as a result of the Indian Premier League (IPL). The main point of contention was that signed players should always be available to their country for international tours, even if it overlaps with the IPL season. To address this, the BCCI officially requested that the International Cricket Council (ICC) to institute a time period in the International Future Tours Programme (FTP), solely for the IPL season. This request was not granted at a subsequent meeting held by the ICC. But since July 2022, ICC FTP granted dedicated 2.5 months window for IPL, during which nearly no international cricket will takes place. IPL is the only cricket league in the world which got dedicated place in ICC FTP.

Conflicts with other entities

Cricket Club of India 

As per IPL rules, the winner of the previous competition decided the venue for the finals. In 2009, the reigning Champions, Rajasthan Royals chose the Brabourne Stadium in Mumbai. However, a dispute regarding use of the pavilion meant that no IPL matches could be held there. The members of the Cricket Club of India that owns the stadium have the sole right to the pavilion on match days, whereas the IPL required the pavilion for its sponsors. The members were offered free seats in the stands, however the club rejected the offer, stating that members could not be moved out of the pavilion.

Media restrictions 

Initially the IPL enforced strict guidelines to media covering matches, consistent with their desire to use the same model sports leagues in North America. Notable guidelines imposed included the restriction to use images taken during the event unless purchased from cricket.com, owned by Live Current Media Inc (who won the rights to such images) and the prohibition of live coverage from the cricket grounds. Media agencies also had to agree to upload all images taken at IPL matches to the official website. This was deemed unacceptable by print media around the world. Upon the threat of boycott, the IPL eased up on several of the restrictions. On 15 April 2008, a revised set of guidelines offering major concessions to the print media and agencies was issued by the IPL and accepted by the Indian Newspaper Society.

Pune Warriors withdrawal 

On 21 May 2013, the Sahara Group-owned IPL franchise Pune Warriors India (PWI) announced its withdrawal from IPL. PWI had failed to pay the full franchise fee for the year 2013. The BCCI then encashed its bank guarantee, causing the Sahara Group to pull out of the league.

Dispute with other cricket boards

Pakistan Cricket Board 
In 2008 Pakistani terrorists attacked Mumbai and murdered hundreds of Indians, it was revealed that the terrorists was trained and sent by Pakistan, it angered majority of Indians, BCCI banned their players. According to Jonathan Liew of The Guardian, "this is a decision driven largely by ideology, nationalism and geopolitics: the dressing room as proxy battlefield, the auction as theatre of war." Many times It is revealed that Pakistani government, Inter-Services Intelligence and Pakistan army train, support and harbouring islamic terrorist and these same terrorists attacks in Jammu And Kashmir (UT) as well as India and kill innocent people. It is act of war against Republic of India. Due to it Government of India and BCCI banned Pakistani players to play in IPL. In 2012, BCCI discouraged its IPL franchise owners to select Pakistani players. In 2022, many IPL team owners purchased teams in South Africa's SA20 cricket league but there also the owners expressed that, they will not buy any Pakistani players, by fearing it could anger Indian fans.

Despite this ban, Wasim Akram has on previous occasions lent coaching services to the Kolkata Knight Riders franchise. He has expressed his support for the idea of Pakistani cricketers being part of the IPL and Indian cricketers also playing in the Pakistan Super League (PSL), stating "sports shouldn't be a victim of politics." Although Pakistan won the 2009 ICC World Twenty20, Pakistani players went unsold in the 2010 IPL auction, an incident that sparked a diplomatic row between the BCCI and PCB. KKR owner Shah Rukh Khan caused a furore in India when he suggested that Pakistani players should have been included in that season, to which the Shiv Sena responded by threatening to boycott him if he did not tender an apology. In 2019, amid worsening relations, the government of Pakistan imposed a ban on the IPL and directed the Pakistan Electronic Media Regulatory Authority to "ensure that no IPL match is aired in Pakistan." Opposite to this Sony Sports shows latter's leauge PSL in India.

There have been some Pakistani-born or Pakistani-origin cricketers of foreign nationalities who have competed in the IPL; these include England's Owais Shah, Azhar Mahmood and Moeen Ali, Australia's Usman Khawaja, South Africa's Imran Tahir and the American Ali Khan.

England and Wales Cricket Board 

Because the inaugural IPL season coincided with the County Championship season as well as New Zealand's tour of England, the ECB and county cricket clubs raised their concerns to the BCCI regarding overseas players. The ECB made it abundantly clear that they would not sign No Objection Certificates for players—a prerequisite for playing in the IPL. Chairmen of the county clubs also made it clear that players contracted to them were required to fulfil their commitment to their county. As a result of this, Dimitri Mascarenhas was the only English player to have signed with the IPL for the 2008 season.

A result of the ECB's concerns about players joining the IPL, was a proposed radical response of creating their own Twenty20 tournament that would be similar in structure to the IPL. The league – titled the Twenty20 English Premier League — would feature 21 teams in three groups of seven and would occur towards the end of the summer season. The ECB enlisted the aid of Texas billionaire Allen Stanford to launch the proposed league. Stanford was the brain behind the successful Stanford 20/20, a tournament that has run twice in the West Indies.  On 17 February 2009, when news of the fraud investigation against Stanford became public, the ECB and WICB withdrew from talks with Stanford on sponsorship. On 20 February the ECB announced it has severed its ties with Stanford and cancelled all contracts with him.

Financial controversies

About tax exemption status 

A controversy was triggered when the Centre gave away potential revenue of  45 crore by granting exemption to International Cricket Council (ICC) on the revenue generated from the recently concluded World Cup Cricket Tournament. In connection the PIL was filed by Shiv Sena leader Subhash Desai seeking a direction to the Maharashtra government and the Income Tax Department to recover entertainment tax from IPL. He also asked the petitioner to make Sharad Pawar a party if he wanted to make allegations against him as he headed the apex cricketing body two years ago.

In August 2011, the then Finance Minister Pranab Mukherjee said that the Income Tax Department is probing allegations of financial irregularities and "criminal activities" against some of the franchisees in the Indian Premier League (IPL).

In June 2011, the Madras High Court said it "could not appreciate" the tax exemption to the Indian Premier League and sought a response from Tamil Nadu government on the issue. The PIL filed by Vasan, alias Sakthi Vasan, had contended that the matches conducted by the IPL "are for the entertainment of the public". He submitted that the tickets for the IPL matches were being sold at exorbitant rates and the higher range of tickets are purchased by the rich and the affluent. The petitioner said the Income Tax Department was the authority for regulating the tariff for entertainment, which he said would include the IPL matches, but the department failed to regulate the (IPL) tariff.

Suspension of Lalit Modi

On 25 April 2010, the BCCI suspended Lalit Modi, the IPL chairman, for "alleged acts of individual misdemeanours". The suspension notice was served on him by Rajeev Shukla, BCCI vice-president, and N Srinivasan, the board secretary, sending an e-mail to the same effect. It followed a day of negotiations with interlocutors attempting to persuade Modi to resign but pre-empted a potential flashpoint at a scheduled IPL governing council meeting, which Modi had said he would attend. Modi was officially barred from participating in the affairs of the Board, the IPL and any other committee of the BCCI.

Chirayu Amin, an industrialist and head of the Baroda Cricket Association, was named interim chairman of the IPL by the BCCI, following Lalit Modi's suspension. According to BCCI, many important documents were missing from the IPL and BCCI offices. "Many of the records are missing. The IT is asking for documents. We don't have them. We have asked BCCI CAO Prof. Ratnakar Shetty to look into the missing records and papers," said BCCI president Shashank Manohar.

Player's corruption scandals

Suspension of Ravindra Jadeja 

In 2010, BCCI banned Ravindra Jadeja from IPL for 1 year, when he violeted IPL player's guidelines by not singing renewal contract with his team Rajasthan Royals and instead negotiating biger amount contract with other teams.

2012 spot-fixing case 

On 14 May 2012, an Indian news channel India TV aired a sting operation which accused five players involved of involvement in spot fixing. The players, TP Sudhindra (Deccan Chargers), Mohnish Mishra (Pune Warriors), Amit Yadav and Shalabh Srivastava (Kings XI Punjab) and Abhinav Bali, a Delhi cricketer, were immediately suspended by IPL commissioner Rajiv Shukla. When pressed on the reliability of the report, India TV editor-in-chief Rajat Sharma, said that the channel had no doubts about the authenticity of the sting operation and prepared to go to court. The IPL Governing Council said that Ravi Sawani, the head of the BCCI's anti-corruption wing would investigate and table his findings within fifteen days.

Additionally, Pune Warriors India player Mohnish Mishra was recorded in another sting operation to be admitting that IPL franchisees paid its players in black money and that he had received  from his team. Mishra suspended by his team, which in a press statement said "Mohnish accepted that the statements made by him on camera were made casually to develop his value or maybe he wanted to be pompous in front of others. He has not received any amount in cash from Sahara. He has apologised for his frivolous and incorrect statements. He will not take any further part in the IPL."

2013 spot-fixing and betting case 

On 16 May 2013, 3 players of Rajasthan Royals were arrested by Delhi Police on charges of spot fixing. The three players were Sreesanth, Ankeet Chavan and Ajit Chandila. All three Players were suspended by BCCI until the inquiry in case is completed by the police. Fresh details emerged later.
All three Players were suspended by BCCI until the inquiry in case is completed by the police. Fresh details emerged later.

On 24 May 2013, Gurunath Meiyappan, a top official of the Chennai Super Kings franchise and son-in-law of BCCI president N. Srinivasan was arrested in Mumbai by Mumbai Crime Branch in connection with illegal betting.

On 25 March 2014 Supreme Court of India told N. Srinivasan to step down from his position on his own as BCCI president in order to ensure a fair investigation, else it would pass verdict asking him to step down.

Other scandals

Molestation charges against Luke Pomersbach 

Amidst the 2012 edition, US citizen Zohal Hamid accused, player Luke Pomersbach for molesting her. Although after much controversy she dropped the charges against him.

Covid-19 pandemic 
The organising of the 2021 IPL season, in the midst of the coronavirus pandemic in India, had been deemed insensitive and unempathetic.

Incidents and players security 
In 2008 season of IPL, Mumbai Indians captain Harbhajan Singh slapped Kings XI Punjab player S. Sreesanth after his side's victory at Mohali. Harbhajan was banned by the IPL for 11 matches and fined his match fees.

In a 2022 interview, Rajasthan Royals and Indian cricketer Yuzvendra Chahal revealed that as a Mumbai Indians player in 2013, he had been dangled over the balcony from the 15th floor of a building by a drunken teammate. Chahal said, "He was very drunk and was looking at me and he just called me. He took me outside and he dangled me from the balcony." He added that "things could have gone wrong if his hands had slipped" and that "he narrowly survived." In a podcast the same year, Chahal said that Mumbai Indians teammates Andrew Symonds and James Franklin had in 2011 bullied him, taped his mouth shut and locked him overnight in a hotel room. Chahal was untied by the hotel staff after being discovered in the morning. 

Umpire Asad Rauf ban 

In 2012 a Mumbai based model alleged Pakistani umpire Asad Rauf for sexually exploiting her. In 2016 BCCI banned him for five year when he was found guilty in disruption and corruption.  There was alligations against Asad Rauf that he was involved in 2013 spot-fixing and took gifts from bookies. He was in wanted list of Mumbai police.

References

External links 
 IPL 2008-2013: The 'controversial' timeline

Indian Premier League
Indian Premier League
Indian Premier League
Lists of controversies